James William McDonnell (August 15, 1922 – April 14, 1993) was a Major League Baseball catcher who played for three seasons. He played for the Cleveland Indians from 1943 to 1945, playing in 50 career games.

External links

1922 births
1993 deaths
Major League Baseball catchers
Cleveland Indians players
Baseball players from Michigan